The Western Dispensary for Women and Children, now defunct, was a Manhattan hospital incorporated in March 1869, located at 218 Ninth Avenue. Unlike the government-funded Northwestern Dispensary, this hospital had trouble meeting their financial obligations.
Abraham Jacobi, a co-founder of the hospital, is regarded as the Father of American Pediatrics.

Controversy
A portion of a large sum left by "an eccentric old maid" was directed by her will to Western Dispensary for Women and Children and several other institutions,
Some of her nieces and nephews contested the will. When Surrogate Court held hearings, there was "a large attendance" of "the various charitable institutions which are beneficiaries."

See also
 List of hospitals in Manhattan
 Anna Lukens, an attending physician of the hospital
 Samuel Baldwin Ward, a surgeon at the hospital

References

External links
 

Defunct hospitals in Manhattan
Healthcare in New York City
Women in New York City